SunnyD (named Sunny Delight prior to circa 2000) is an orange drink developed in 1963 by Doric Foods of Mount Dora, Florida, United States. Additional plants were built in California and Ohio in 1974 and 1978, respectively. In April 1983, Sundor Brands bought out Doric Foods; Sundor Brands was then purchased by American multinational Procter & Gamble in March 1989. The drink is superficially related to orange juice, but also resembles a soft drink without carbonation. 

The drink produced an estimated $450 million in revenue for Procter & Gamble in 2004. In 2005, Sunny Delight was spun off into the independent Sunny Delight Beverages Company (SDBC). The beverage is also distributed by Dr Pepper/Seven Up (DPSU). In Canada, the drink is manufactured and distributed by Saputo.

The beverage was launched in the United Kingdom in April 1998 with a £10 million promotional campaign, and by August 1999, it became the third biggest selling drink in the United Kingdom, behind Coca-Cola and Pepsi. 

It was sold in refrigerated cabinets, and marketed as a healthier alternative to soft drinks despite neither being healthier nor requiring refrigeration. Despite the name, SunnyD is not a high source of vitamin D, nor has it ever claimed to be; however, it contains significant amounts of vitamin C.

SunnyD started out with only one flavor: orange. Now it comes in multiple flavors: Tangy Original, Smooth Orange, Orange Strawberry, Orange Mango, Orange Peach, Watermelon, Fruit Punch, Peach, Mango, Blue Raspberry, Cherry Limeade, Lemonade, and Orange Pineapple.

Ingredients 

Water
 High fructose corn syrup
 2% or less of the following:
 Citric acid
 Ascorbic acid
 Thiamin hydrochloride
 Natural flavors
 Modified cornstarch
 Canola oil
 Sodium citrate
 Cellulose gum
 Sucralose
 Acesulfame potassium
 Neotame
 Sodium hexametaphosphate
 Potassium sorbate
 Yellow #5
 Yellow #6
 Concentrated juices:
 Orange
 Tangerine
 Apple
 Lime
 Grapefruit
 Pear
 Red #33
 Red #40

Promotional campaigns

Reach for the Sun Bottle Hunt

In the middle of the 1990s, Sunny Delight sponsored an early internet contest promoting their beverage. For the game, the "Reach for the Sun Bottle Hunt", simple graphics depicting Sunny Delight bottles were incorporated into independent American web sites. The site locations were various personal home pages or more well known internet resources.

At the main contest site, riddles were provided weekly to help people discover each of the sites displaying a hidden bottle. Participants were encouraged to use the newest search engines in combination with the riddles.

Initially appearing in 1996 and gaining widespread attention, the contest was repeated three times over the course of a year and a half, and over 4,000 prizes were awarded during each iteration, ranging from T-shirts to college scholarships. As a pioneering internet advertising meme, it set the stage for years of later web marketing promotions.

Peel 'n Taste Flavor Strips
In July 2009, to promote the company's Sunny Delight Smoothies, the company partnered with Food Lion supermarkets to place SunnyD Smoothies Peel 'n Taste flavor samplers in the aisles where Sunny Delight products were located.

Reformulation
In recent years, the artificial sweetener sucralose has been added in combination with high fructose corn syrup, in order to cut the calorie count.

As of 2023, North American Sunny Delight contains 2% or less concentrated fruit juice.

Controversies
In the United Kingdom, there were many negative press reports about the product, following an investigation by The Food Commission, an independent consumer organisation in the United Kingdom.

In December 1999, according to a report by BBC News, the negative publicity escalated when a Sunny Delight television commercial showing a snowman turning orange was released, at about the same time as reports of a four-year-old girl who experienced her skin turning orange – due to the product's use of beta-Carotene for color – after drinking an estimated 1.5 liters of Sunny Delight a day.

Sales had halved by 2001, and the drink was redesigned and reinvented in March 2003 as "SunnyD". In the United Kingdom, SunnyD was relaunched in March 2009, with a new formulation containing 70% fruit juice and no artificial ingredients or added sugar. However, amid declining sales, the product was further reformulated in April 2010, as a lower priced beverage containing only 15% fruit juice.

The brand's Twitter account is known for its odd tweets; one particular tweet, saying "I can't do this anymore" created extensive engagement from other brands, but has received criticism for trivializing and monetizing mental illness.

See also
 Capri Sun
Tang
Kool-Aid
 Orange drink
Orange juice
 Soft drinks

References

External links
 Official site
 Official UK site
 Official Spanish site
 A profile at BBC News

Former Procter & Gamble brands
Juice brands
Products introduced in 1963